The Mundaka wave, at Mundaka in the Basque Country, northern Spain, is a surfing location considered one of the best lefts of the world.

Surfing 

Huge swells roll in from the Bay of Biscay and slam into the rocky coastline of the Basque Country. The estuary at Mundaka has created a perfect sandbar which forms hollow waves that can be watched from the town's harbor wall. Mundaka was formerly one of the sites of the World Championship Tour of Surfing. Some great surfers have marked their legacy on Mundaka such as Andy Irons, Taj Burrow, Kelly Slater, Mark Occilupo and Joel Parkinson.

The wave of Mundaka is “perfect” for surfing one of every three days of the year. During the months of winter, the possibility of surfing increases until surpassing 50%. And it is the month of January, with a 62% of surfable days, when the bar of Mundaka displays the best scene for the lovers of this sport.

History of Billabong Pro Mundaka
Billabong Pro Mundaka is one of the most important tests of the ASP World Tour. It is celebrated in Mundaka from the beginning of  October until mid October. In eight years the event has had to be suspended twice. First, in 2001, due to the 9/11 attacks in New York. Second, in 2005 by the hand of the man.

Disappearance of the wave
The wave of Mundaka is seriously damaged. Its situation is critical although non irreversible. This is what the surfers want to think due to the fact that they have seen how their appraised jewel has not done act of appearance in the last months. Everything began in 2003, when the Murueta shipyard [???"coat 57 tons of laughs of mundaca"???], with the aim of making it more passable for different sized ships. Consequently, the sea of Mundaka has suffered the disappearance of one of its most valued waves.  Also, the action has caused the disappearance of Mundaka, from the professional circuit of surfing.

Cancellation of the test in 2005 
The extraction in 2003 of almost 300,000 cubic meters of sand laughs of Urdaibai, caused that the most famous left of Europe  would lose its position in match WCT of the ASP. The characteristics of the wave changed as if a disease had seized her. The tube of 400 meters that formed diminished until 40 meters long, starting to disappear. A diving lead the consequence that, lamentably, all saw come: that the ASP suspended the test of 2005. Mundaca, which had received an average of 10,000 visitors with the event, lost its main reclamation and sectors of the region as the guest houses entered into an enormous crisis. Studies of the department of Environment and the University of the Basque Country (UPV) agreed upon indicating that the wave was debilitated by the drainage realised by the shipyard of Murueta. The sand was deposited on the beach of Laida and finished changing to the structure of the marine bottom and the flow of the currents. The investigations also kept awake that the own Nature was in charge to forge a similar morphology to which existed before 2003. The force of the sea returned to give to hope to Mundaca and the Billabong Pro. After months of exhaustive study, as much the ASP as the sponsor of the event, Billabong, gave the green light around Mundaca to the calendar of the maximum worldwide surfer competition.

Last champions

Other consequences aside from the environmental ones
After the initial commotion, Mundaka begins little by little to assimilate the enormous loss that represents for the municipality the exclusion of the Billabong Pro of worldwide circuit WCT of surfing. It has been a cold water jug for Mundaka and all the Basque seashore. For the proprietors of guest house businesses and establishments generally, the appointment represents an important source of income “equivalent to a whole summer”.

External links
BillabongPro.com
Mundaka.com
NavieraMurueta.com

Biscay
Surfing locations
Surfing_in_Spain